The Tremadocian is the lowest stage of Ordovician. Together with the later Floian Stage it forms the Lower Ordovician Epoch. The base of the Tremadocian is defined as the first appearance of the conodont species Iapetognathus fluctivagus at the Global Boundary Stratotype Section and Point (GSSP) section on Newfoundland.

Naming
The Tremadocian is named after the village Tremadoc in Wales. The name was proposed by Adam Sedgwick in 1846 (as "Tremadoc group").

GSSP
The GSSP for the beginning of the Tremadocian is the Greenpoint section in Gros Morne National Park, in western Newfoundland. It is defined as the first appearance of the conodont species Iapetognathus fluctivagus. This horizon can be found 101.8 m above the Greenpoint section datum within bed number 23. The boundary lies within the Broom Point Member, of the Green Point Formation which is part of the Cow Head Group. The first planktonic graptolites appear 4.8 m above the first appearance of Iapetognathus fluctivagus at Greenpoint section.

The Tremadocian ends with the beginning of the Floian which is defined as the first appearance of Tetragraptus approximatus at the GSSP in Diabasbrottet quarry, Västergötland, Sweden.

Regional stages
In North America the first stage of the Ordovician is the Gasconadian Stage. In Baltoscandic region the stages corresponding to Tremadocian are Pakerort stage (older) and Varangu stage (younger).

Evolution
The Cambrian Stage 10-Tremadocian boundary is marked by the Cambrian-Ordovician extinction event. It led to the extinction of many brachipods, conodonts and severely reduced the number of trilobite species. Overall the amount of biodiversity of the Cambrian was maintained. The evolutionary radiation that would eventually triple the amount of genera during the Ordovician (the Great Ordovician Biodiversification Event) slowly picks up during the Tremadocian.

Conodonts diversified during the Tremadocian, though not to the same extent as they would in the following Floian. Planktonic graptolites, an important index fossil, appear during the Tremadocian. 

The middle of the Tremadocian witnessed an extinction event known as the Mid-Tremadocian Extinction Event or the Base Stairsian Mass Extinction Event, which is particularly known to have affected Baltican conodonts. This extinction event may have been caused by anoxia.

Ocean and climate

The Early Ordovician in general was a time of transgression. The climate was slowly cooling throughout the Ordovician.

References

.
Ordovician geochronology